Benjámin Ceiner (born 24 April 1992) is a Hungarian sprint kayaker. He competed in the K-2 1000 and K-4 1000 m events at the 2016 Summer Olympics and placed 7th and 11th, respectively.

References

1992 births
Living people
Hungarian male canoeists
Canoeists at the 2016 Summer Olympics
Olympic canoeists of Hungary
ICF Canoe Sprint World Championships medalists in kayak
Canoeists from Budapest
21st-century Hungarian people